Beatriz Haddad Maia was the defending champion, but chose not to participate.

Taylor Townsend won the title, defeating Ajla Tomljanović in the final, 6–3, 2–6, 6–2.

Seeds

Draw

Finals

Top half

Bottom half

References
Main Draw

Waco Showdown - Singles